Pranitha Subhash is an Indian actress who predominantly appears in Kannada, Telugu, Tamil, and Hindi films. She debuted as an actress in the 2010 Kannada film, Porki. In 2012, she starred in the critically acclaimed film Bheema Theeradalli. She went on to appear in several commercially successful Telugu and Tamil films like Baava (2010),  Attarintiki Daredi (2013), Massu Engira Masilamani (2015), and Enakku Vaaitha Adimaigal (2017).

Career
Pranitha debuted in the 2010 Kannada film Porki opposite Darshan. After the success of Porki, she refused several offers from Kannada films and became choosy about her projects before signing for the Telugu film Baava, a love story where she starred opposite Siddharth. She was praised unanimously for her portrayal of a Telugu village belle in the film. She then went on to appear in her first Tamil film, Udhayan, starring Arulnithi.

She was then signed up for her second Tamil project Saguni, opposite Karthi, which released in both Tamil and Telugu languages. Saguni was her biggest release: a film that released in a record 1,150 theatres all over the world.

She then appeared in Jarasandha and Bheema Theeradalli, a real-life story of a naxalite, both opposite Duniya Vijay. Subhash was praised for her portrayal of Bheemavva by critics and won a Filmfare nomination for the same. She won the Santosham award that year for Bheema Theeradalli.

She then acted in the Kannada film Whistle, for which she earned a nomination at the SIIMA awards.

After this, she appeared in the Telugu language film Attarintiki Daredi, which was released in September 2013 and went on to become the highest grossing Telugu language film of all time, collecting over ₹100 crore. It also won her nominations at various award events. The film is being remade in other languages.

During the same time, she worked on a Kannada film Brahma, opposite Upendra. She also worked on Pandavulu Pandavulu Thummeda, starring Raveena Tandon and Mohan Babu, in which she was paired opposite Manchu Manoj. Both the films fared well. After a brief gap of two years, she signed for another Tamil film Masss, opposite Suriya in late November 2014. In late 2014, she signed for a Telugu film Dynamite, opposite Manchu Vishnu.

In late June 2015, she acted in the Telugu film Brahmotsavam, featuring Mahesh Babu.

She recently worked with Ayushmann Khurrana in the song "Chan Kitthan".

In December 2020, Subhash completed her executive education and received a degree in Professional & Leadership Development from Harvard Kennedy School.

Other work

Endorsements
Subhash endorsed brands like Joyalukkas, SVB Silks Salem, Bombay Jewellery, Welight Academy of Education, Sri Lakshmi Jewellery, Pondichery and 
RS Brothers. She was signed as the brand ambassador of the team Karnataka Bulldozers in the Celebrity Cricket League in its third season in 2013. In October 2014, Subhash along with Anu Prabhakar was selected as the ambassador for the Jewels of India – a fashion jewellery exhibition in Bangalore.
Subhash was the brand ambassador of Jewels Exotica the following year.
She was the face of GRB and Lulu mall among others.

Business
Subhash bought stakes in a hospitality company and now co-owns a restaurant called Bootlegger on Lavelle Road, Bangalore.

Philanthropy
Subhash has been involved in various philanthropic activities in India. She is working towards modernizing public education in Karnataka by adopting schools and providing them with better infrastructure and sanitation facilities. Subhash and a group of volunteers refurbished an ageing school in Karnataka's Hassan district. She has been committed to the cause by bringing an overhaul in the infrastructure and introducing language teachers in the schools. Today, at least 13 such schools have been adopted by various individuals and has set a precedence to the others. She contributed US$10,000 to the same cause. In April 2019, the Election Commission (EC), along with Rahul Dravid, had appointed Subhash as a brand ambassador to promote awareness among general public on voting before the 2019 general election in India. The initiative was termed as "State Icons" and aimed to reach out to millions of voters in Karnataka. In 2018, Subhash was a part of the Young South Indian Leaders delegation, organised by the Ministry of Foreign Affairs of Israel.

Personal life
Pranitha married businessman Nitin Raju in an intimate ceremony on 30 May 2021. They have a daughter born in 2022.

Filmography

Awards and nominations

References

External links 

 
 

Living people
Indian film actresses
21st-century Indian actresses
Actresses from Bangalore
Actresses in Telugu cinema
Kannada actresses
Actresses in Tamil cinema
Actresses in Kannada cinema
Female models from Bangalore
Santosham Film Awards winners
Indian Hindus
Actresses in Hindi cinema
Year of birth missing (living people)